Americana is the third album by Starflyer 59. It was the last of the band's three consecutive albums featuring monochromatic covers. Unlike their first two albums, this album was given a title, rather than fans attaching a title based on the color of the cover.

The album was released on cassette, compact disc and vinyl.

Track listing
All songs written by Jason Martin.

Personnel
Jason Martin – guitars, lead vocals, Moog synthesizer
Eric Campuzano – bass
Wayne Everett – drums, backing vocals, tambourine
Gene Eugene – producer, vibraphone, organ
Brandon Ebel – executive producer
Jason 71 – art direction, photography

References

1997 albums
Starflyer 59 albums
Tooth & Nail Records albums